Rockabye is a 1986 made-for-TV crime drama film, directed by Richard Michaels and starring Valerie Bertinelli, Rachel Ticotin, Jason Alexander, and Jimmy Smits.

Plot
Stranded in New York City due to missing a bus caused by a delay of a plane, recently divorced mother Susannah Bartok (Valerie Bertinelli) is attacked and maced outside Macy's in Manhattan, and her 2-year-old son gets kidnapped. After she unsuccessfully pleads to the police, who feel indifferent about the case, newspaper reporter Victoria Garcia (Rachel Ticotin) helps the young mother in finding her son. Susannah, desperate to find her son, initially rejects Victoria's help because she is realistic about the possible fate of her boy, though convinced that the police are not doing their job quickly enough, she allows Victoria's help. Victoria redirects Susannah to a psychic called Christopher Zellner (Roderick Cook), who believes that her son Sonny is dead. Susannah refuses to believe him, and continues her intense and exhausting search. After putting a photo of her son in the newspaper, several 'witnesses' report to the police, but they are all frauds, annoying Lt. Ernest Foy (Jason Alexander). During their search, they discover an underground black market ring, selling young children.

Cast
 Valerie Bertinelli as Susannah Bartok
 Rachel Ticotin as Victoria Garcia
 Jason Alexander as Lt. Ernest Foy
 Ray Baker as Donald F. Donald
 Roderick Cook as Christopher Zellner
 Jonathan Raskin as Sonny

References

External links
 
 
 

1986 films
1986 television films
1986 crime drama films
Films based on American novels
Films set in Manhattan
Films set in New York City
American crime drama films
Films about kidnapping
American drama television films
Films directed by Richard Michaels
1980s American films